HD 93833 is a star in the constellation of Sextans. Its apparent magnitude is 5.842, but interstellar dust makes it appear 0.202 magnitudes dimmer than it should be. It is located some 340 light-years (104 parsecs) away, based on parallax.

HD 93833 is a K-type giant star. It has evolved from the main sequence to a radius of 10.5 times that of the Sun. It emits 49.4 times as much energy as the Sun at a surface temperature of 4,720 K.

References

Sextans (constellation)
K-type giants
Durchmusterung objects
093833
052948
4233